Ilyes Housni (born 14 May 2005) is a French professional footballer with Moroccan roots who plays as a forward for Ligue 1 club Paris Saint-Germain.

Early career 
Ilyes Housni was born in Créteil, Île-de-France. He played with several clubs of the region, from Créteil in his home town to AS Jeunesse Aubervilliers, including spells at Paris FC and RC Joinville. He entered the Paris Saint-Germain Academy in 2019, soon becoming a great prospect of the club, along players such as Ismaël Gharbi.

Club career 
Housni first made headlines with PSG's under-19s on 1 October 2022, scoring a double hat-trick against Reims in the Championnat National U19, as his side won 9–0 at home. Four days later, he proved to be also decisive in the UEFA Youth League, scoring the only goal of a 1–0 away win to Benfica, against a side that included most of the players that won the previous edition.

On 21 December 2022, Housni scored his first two goals with Paris Saint-Germain's senior team in a 3–1 friendly win over Quevilly-Rouen at the Camp des Loges. He signed his first professional contract with PSG on 30 December, committing to a deal until 30 June 2026. On 6 January 2023, Housni made his professional debut during a 3–1 away Coupe de France win over Châteauroux, coming on as a late replacement for Carlos Soler. He made his Ligue 1 debut as a substitute in a 3–1 defeat away to Monaco on 11 February.

International career 
Eligible for the Morocco national team through his origins, Housni is a youth international for France, making his debut for the France under-17s in August 2021. In September 2022, he played the Tournoi de Limoges with the France under-18s, scoring goals against Scotland and Poland.

Style of play 
An offensive-minded player, Housni is able to play in most positions of the attack, mainly playing as a centre-forward or a left-winger during his time at the PSG Academy.

From an early age, he has been described as a player with great pace and execution, a smart forward good at attacking spaces and the depth of the field.

Career statistics

References

External links

Ilyes Housni profile  with UNFP (in French)

2005 births
Living people
French footballers
France youth international footballers
Association football forwards
Sportspeople from Créteil
French sportspeople of Moroccan descent
US Créteil-Lusitanos players
Paris FC players
Paris Saint-Germain F.C. players